The New United Democratic Party (NUDP) was a political party of South Korea from 1987 to 1991. The party was established as the Peace Democratic Party (PDP) in October 1987 by Kim Dae-jung and his followers to contest the presidential election that year. The party later merged with Democratic Party to form the Democratic Party.

History

Following the June Struggle of 1987, and the June 29 Declaration, which promised direct, democratic election of the president in the upcoming presidential election in December of that year, speculation for the potential candidacy of Kim Dae-jung for the presidency grew. The Declaration also promised amnesty to Kim Dae-jung, who was under the house-arrest and was barred from engaging in any political activity under the fabricated charge of "inciting rebellion" since 1981. While Kim Dae-jung was barred from engaging in any political activities, Kim Young-sam emerged as the main opposition leader. Despite the effort to present the single "democratic" candidate for the 1987 presidential election, the negotiation between two politicians broke down. Kim Dae-jung and his followers split from the Reunification Democratic Party and created the Peace Democratic Party in October 29, less than 2 months before the election. Kim Dae-jung and Kim Young-sam's candidacy resulted in vote-splitting of the "Democratic" candidates, resulting in the election of Roh Tae-woo, protégé of dictator Chun Doo-hwan to take the office with 36.6% of votes.

Despite the defeat in the presidential election, the party fared well in the 1988 legislative election, coming first in the city of Seoul and dominating South-western Jeolla region, Peace Democratic Party beat Kim Young-sam's Reunification Democratic Party and emerged as the main opposition to the ruling Democratic Justice Party. However, the merger of Democratic Justice Party, Reunification Democratic Party, and New Democratic Republican Party in January 1990, forming the Democratic Liberal Party, effectively isolated Kim Dae-jung and his party in the National Assembly.

The party changed its name to New United Democratic Party on 14 April 1991 to contest the 1991 local election but the disappointing election result and upcoming presidential election spurred Kim Dae-jung to create a new party. Kim allied himself with the Democratic Party, who split from the Reunification Democratic Party in 1990, opposing the merger with conservative ruling Democratic Liberal Party. The merger resulted in the establishment of the Democratic Party.

Election results

President

Legislature

Local

See also
List of political parties in South Korea
Politics of South Korea
Elections in South Korea
Liberalism in South Korea

Notes

References

Democratic parties in South Korea
Defunct political parties in South Korea
Conservative liberal parties
Political parties established in 1987
Political parties disestablished in 1991
1987 establishments in South Korea
1991 disestablishments in South Korea